1283 Komsomolia is a metallic background asteroid and potentially slow rotator from the outer regions of the asteroid belt. Discovered by Vladimir Albitsky in 1925, it was later named after Komsomol, a political youth organization of the former Soviet Union.

Discovery 

Komsomolia was discovered on 25 September 1925, by Soviet astronomer Vladimir Albitsky at the Simeiz Observatory on the Crimean peninsula. It was independently discovered by German astronomer Karl Reinmuth at Heidelberg Observatory on 10 October 1925. Only the first discoverer is officially recognized.

Orbit and classification 

Komsomolia is a non-family asteroid of the main belt's background population when applying the hierarchical clustering method to its proper orbital elements. It orbits the Sun in the outer main-belt at a distance of 2.5–3.9 AU once every 5 years and 8 months (2,075 days). Its orbit has an eccentricity of 0.22 and an inclination of 9° with respect to the ecliptic. The body's observation arc begins at Heidelberg in October 1902, almost 23 years prior to its official discovery observation.

Naming 

This minor planet was named after Komsomol ("All-Union Leninist Young Communist League"), the youth wing of the Communist Party of the Soviet Union (CPSU). The official  was published by the Minor Planet Center in November 1952.

Physical characteristics 

Komsomolia has been characterized as a metallic M-type asteroid by the Wide-field Infrared Survey Explorer (WISE). The Asteroid Lightcurve Database assumes it to be a carbonaceous C-type asteroid.

Rotation period 

In December 2006, a fragmentary rotational lightcurve of Komsomolia was obtained from photometric observations by French amateur astronomer Pierre Antonini. Lightcurve analysis gave a rotation period of 96 hours with a brightness amplitude of 1.03 magnitude.

Diameter and albedo 

According to the surveys carried out by the Infrared Astronomical Satellite IRAS, the Japanese Akari satellite and the NEOWISE mission of NASA's WISE telescope, Komsomolia measures between 26.87 and 36.09 kilometers in diameter and its surface has an albedo between 0.071 and 0.1856. The Collaborative Asteroid Lightcurve Link derives an albedo of 0.1703 and a diameter of 26.78 kilometers based on an absolute magnitude of 10.4.

References

External links 
 Lightcurve Database Query (LCDB), at www.minorplanet.info
 Dictionary of Minor Planet Names, Google books
 Asteroids and comets rotation curves, CdR – Geneva Observatory, Raoul Behrend
 Discovery Circumstances: Numbered Minor Planets (1)-(5000) – Minor Planet Center
 
 

001283
Discoveries by Vladimir Albitsky
Named minor planets
19250925